The Novomoskovsk uezd was one of the subdivisions of the Yekaterinoslav Governorate of the Russian Empire. It was situated in the northwestern part of the governorate. Its administrative centre was Novomoskovsk.

Demographics
At the time of the Russian Empire Census of 1897, Novomoskovsky Uyezd had a population of 260,368. Of these, 93.2% spoke Ukrainian, 3.7% Russian, 1.4% Yiddish, 1.3% German, 0.1% Polish, 0.1% Romani and 0.1% Belarusian as their native language.

References

 
Uyezds of Yekaterinoslav Governorate
Yekaterinoslav Governorate